The 1974 Fiesta Bowl was the fourth edition of the college football bowl game, played at Sun Devil Stadium in Tempe, Arizona on Saturday, December 28. Part of the 1974–75 bowl game season, it matched the unranked Oklahoma State Cowboys of the Big Eight Conference and #17 BYU Cougars of the Western Athletic Conference (WAC). After falling behind early, underdog Oklahoma State won 16–6.

Teams

Oklahoma State

BYU

Game summary
The kickoff was shortly after 2 p.m. MST, following the Sun Bowl, both televised by CBS. The weather in Tempe was cloudy with light rain.

A shoulder injury to BYU quarterback Gary Sheide late in the first quarter led to a defensive battle. After completing four of five passes for 43 yards and leading the Cougars to two field goals, he was knocked out of the game, hit from behind by Cowboy defensive lineman Phil Dokes.

Oklahoma State quickly took advantage, as Tony Buck returned an interception of BYU backup Mark Giles to the Cougar 26-yard line. Three plays later, Kenny Walker took a pitch and raced around the left end for a twelve-yard touchdown run to lead by a point at halftime.

Oklahoma State scored again in the third quarter on a 42-yard field goal by Abby Daigle to take a 10–6 lead. With under ten minutes left in the game, BYU began a long drive from their own two. Giles marched his club all the way to the OSU 28 on short passes and runs, but turned the ball over on downs when a fourth down pass fell incomplete. The Cowboys then took control of the ball and clock and scored with 1:14 remaining on a forty-yard halfback pass play from Leonard Thompson to Gerald Bain.

Walker finished with 35 yards rushing and was named the offensive player of the game; Dokes took the defensive honor.

Scoring
First quarter
 BYU – Mark Uselman 30-yard field goal
 BYU – Uselman 43-yard field goal
Second quarter
 OSU – Kenny Walker 12-yard run (Abby Daigle kick)
Third quarter
 OSU – Daigle 42-yard field goal
Fourth quarter
 OSU – Gerald Bain 40-yard pass from Leonard Thompson (kick failed)

Statistics
{| class=wikitable style="text-align:center"
! Statistics !!OSU!!BYU
|-
|align=left|First downs || 14|| 17
|-
|align=left|Rushes–yards|| 55–147|| 36–120
|-
|align=left|Passing yards|| 77|| 181
|-
|align=left|Passes|| 7–18–0|| 15–31–3
|-
|align=left|Return yards || 64 || 3
|-
|align=left|Total offense || 73–224|| 67–301
|-
|align=left|Punts–average ||7–41.9|| 6–41.8
|-
|align=left|Fumbles–lost ||6–0|| 3–1
|-
|align=left|Turnovers|| 0|| 4
|-
| Penalties–yards ||12–84|| 9–66
|}

References

External links
 Fiesta Bowl – December 28, 1974

Fiesta Bowl
Fiesta Bowl
BYU Cougars football bowl games
Oklahoma State Cowboys football bowl games
December 1974 sports events in the United States
Fiesta Bowl